The 2018 Deloitte Tankard, the provincial men's curling championship of Nova Scotia, was held from January 8 to 14 at the Dartmouth Curling Club in Dartmouth. The winning Jamie Murphy team represented Nova Scotia at the 2018 Tim Hortons Brier in Regina, Saskatchewan.

Teams
Teams are as follows:

Round-robin standings

Scores

January 9
Draw 1
 Stevens 9-4 Power
 Dacey 7-6 MacDougall
 Murphy 10-2 Flemming
 K. Thompson 10-9 S. Thompson

January 10
Draw 2
 MacDougall 7-6 Murphy
 K. Thompson 6-5 Stevens
 S. Thompson 9-6 Power
 Dacey 8-2 Flemming

Draw 3
 S. Thompson 9-6 Flemming
 Murphy 8-2 Power
 Dacey 4-7 K. Thompson
 Stevens 6-5 MacDougall

January 11
Draw 4
 Murphy 7-1 Dacey
 S. Thompson 4-5 Stevens
 MacDougall 8-9 Flemming
 K. Thompson 4-5 Power

Draw 5
 Stevens 8-4 Flemming
 Dacey 8-3 Power
 Murphy 12-6 K. Thompson
 S. Thompson 10-3 MacDougall

January 12
Draw 6 
 S. Thompson 6-8 Dacey
 K. Thompson 7-10 Flemming
 MacDougall 10-9 Power
 Murphy 8-3 Stevens

Draw 7
 K. Thompson 10-6 MacDougall
 Murphy 6-7 S. Thompson
 Dacey 7-6 Stevens
 Power 4-3 Flemming

January 13
Tiebreaker 1
Stevens 4-10 S. Thompson

Tiebreaker 2
K. Thompson 5-7 S. Thompson

Playoffs

Semifinal
Saturday, January 13, 1:00 pm

Final
Sunday, January 14, 9:00am

References

January 2018 sports events in Canada
2018 Tim Hortons Brier
Curling competitions in Halifax, Nova Scotia
Sport in Dartmouth, Nova Scotia
2018 in Nova Scotia